Miguel Ángel Angulo Valderrey (born 23 June 1977) is a Spanish former professional footballer, currently manager of Valencia CF Mestalla. Predominantly an attacking midfielder, he was also able to play as a right winger and even as a right-back or a forward.

Basing his football on inexhaustible physical display, Angulo was much appreciated by trainers because of his versatility, and spent most of his career at Valencia where he won a total of seven major titles, including two La Liga championships and the 2004 UEFA Cup.

Club career

Valencia
Born in Oviedo, Asturias, Angulo began his football career with local Sporting de Gijón, joining Valencia CF in January 1996 at the age of 18. After spending some time with the reserves he was loaned in the 1996–97 campaign to Segunda División club Villarreal CF, before returning to Valencia the following summer.

Angulo made 434 competitive appearances during his spell at the Mestalla Stadium, being a very important element in the Ches La Liga conquest in 2002 and 2004 (totalling six goals in 48 games), while also starting in the 2004 UEFA Cup final which they won after defeating Olympique de Marseille. Due to the ageing of the previous starter, French Jocelyn Angloma, he played several matches as an attacking right-back, as the team operated mainly in a 5–3–2 formation.

In the summer of 2004, Angulo pulled out of a transfer to Arsenal after a last minute change of heart. His agent claimed this was due to the player's anxiety at moving to London; he had already completed part of his medical. He continued to be heavily played by Valencia in the following three seasons, netting 15 times in 93 league games. On 15 December 2004, he was handed a seven-match ban by UEFA after being sent off in a UEFA Cup tie against SV Werder Bremen where he kicked Nelson Valdez and subsequently spat on Tim Borowski.

On 20 December 2007, Angulo, along with Santiago Cañizares and David Albelda, was axed from the squad by new coach Ronald Koeman. In late April of the following year, however, with Koeman's sacking, all three were reinstated by new manager Voro in a squad seriously threatened with relegation, with five remaining fixtures. On 27 April he returned to action, playing five minutes in a 3–0 home win over CA Osasuna after having come on as a substitute for David Villa. He started his first post-reinstatement match two weeks later, scoring in a 5–1 away rout of already relegated Levante UD.

Sporting CP
In August 2009, after a mediocre campaign individually, Angulo was released by Valencia, thus ending a 14-year relationship. Late in the same month he agreed to a one-year contract with Sporting CP, but after just four months, he was released by the Lisbon club, grossly unsettled, and pondered his retirement, which was confirmed the following week.

International career
Angulo made his debut for Spain on 17 November 2004, in a 1–0 friendly win against England played in Madrid. Going on to collect 11 caps, he never took part in any major tournament, however.

Angulo also represented the nation at the 1997 FIFA World Youth Championship (five appearances) and the 2000 Summer Olympics (five), helping to a runner-up finish in the latter competition.

Career statistics
Club
Source:

International
Source:

Managerial statistics

HonoursValenciaLa Liga: 2001–02, 2003–04
Copa del Rey: 1998–99
Supercopa de España: 1999
UEFA Cup: 2003–04
UEFA Super Cup: 2004
UEFA Intertoto Cup: 1998Spain U18UEFA European Under-18 Championship: 1995Spain U21UEFA European Under-21 Championship: 1998Spain U23'
Summer Olympics silver medal: 2000

References

External links

CiberChe biography and stats 

1977 births
Living people
Spanish footballers
Footballers from Oviedo
Association football midfielders
Association football forwards
Association football utility players
La Liga players
Segunda División players
Segunda División B players
Sporting de Gijón B players
Valencia CF Mestalla footballers
Valencia CF players
Villarreal CF players
Primeira Liga players
Sporting CP footballers
UEFA Cup winning players
Spain youth international footballers
Spain under-21 international footballers
Spain under-23 international footballers
Spain international footballers
Footballers at the 2000 Summer Olympics
Olympic footballers of Spain
Olympic medalists in football
Olympic silver medalists for Spain
Medalists at the 2000 Summer Olympics
Spanish expatriate footballers
Expatriate footballers in Portugal
Spanish expatriate sportspeople in Portugal
Spanish football managers
Segunda Federación managers
Tercera Federación managers
Valencia CF Mestalla managers
Valencia CF non-playing staff